Ladislau Peter (1899 – July 1995) was a Romanian sprinter. He competed in the men's 100 metres at the 1928 Summer Olympics.

References

1899 births
1995 deaths
Athletes (track and field) at the 1928 Summer Olympics
Romanian male sprinters
Olympic athletes of Romania
Place of birth missing